N Train could refer to:
The N (New York City Subway service)
The N Judah in San Francisco
N Red Line in Houston
N scale for model railroads